Secret Love is a live album by pianist Tete Montoliu recorded in Breda in 1977 and released on the Dutch label, Timeless.

Track listing
 "Secret Love" (Sammy Fain, Johnny Mercer) – 10:45
 "Airegin" (Sonny Rollins) – 5:31
 "Confirmation" (Charlie Parker) – 7:30
 "Four" (Miles Davis) – 8:51
 "Stella by Starlight" (Victor Young, Ned Washington) – 16:41

Personnel
Tete Montoliu – piano
Sam Jones – bass
Billy Higgins – drums

References

Tete Montoliu albums
1978 albums
Timeless Records albums